AJ Swanepoel Stadium is a multi-sports stadium in Ermelo, Mpumalanga, South Africa.

It is the home venue of Vodacom League football teams Mologadi FC and Sekhukhune Lions.

References

Soccer venues in South Africa
Sports venues in Mpumalanga